Quanergy Systems is a publicly held Silicon Valleybased technology company that develops LiDAR (Light Detection and Ranging) sensors and related technology.

History  
Quanergy was co-founded in 2012 by Louay Eldada, Angus Pacala (also co-founder of lidar company Ouster), and Tianyue Yu. Headquartered in Sunnyvale, California; it is a provider of LiDAR sensors and perception software for real-time capture and processing of 3D spatial data and object detection, tracking, identification and classification.

Quanergy's AI-based LiDAR-based sensor technology have five primary applications: 3D mapping, security, smart cities & smart spaces, social distancing, industrial automation, and transportation to increase productivity, efficiency, and safety and reduce cost.

In April 2020, Kevin Kennedy was appointed CEO in addition to his existing role as chairman of the board. Following his appointment, the company raised additional funding, bringing the total funds raised to approximately $195 million.

In June 2021, Quanergy agreed to go public via reverse SPAC merger with CITIC Capital Acquisition Corp.

In December 2022, Quanergy has filed for Chapter 11 bankruptcy.

Technology 

 Quanergy's Flow Management platform: combines 3D LiDAR sensors with its QORTEX DTC software to anonymously and accurately track and analyze the flow of people and objects in real time within retail locations, airports, public venues, commercial and government buildings, and industrial warehouses. Consists of two different products, M series with QORTEX DTC (Detect, Track, Classify), and QORTEX People Counter.
 QORTEX DTC (Detect, Track, Classify): is paired with the M-series mechanical LiDAR sensor to enable accurate, real-time tracking of people and vehicles for security, social distancing, smart city, and smart space applications.
 QORTEX People Counter  delivers high accuracy people counting and queue management capabilities for smart spaces and social distancing applications.
 M-Series LiDAR sensors: mechanical 360 degree LiDAR sensors used for mapping, security, smart city and smart space applications. 
 M1: a next generation 2D industrial LiDAR sensor for mid- to long-range, high precision measurement applications.
 M1 Edge PoE: combines smart object detection software with Quanergy’s M-Series LiDAR sensors to enable smart awareness for applications that require simple object detection and alerting capabilities. 
M1 Prime: provides industry-leading pinpoint accuracy of 0.0330.132° and captures up to 2x more data with 1.3M points per second with three returns.  
 MQ-8: delivers up to 140m continuous tracking range, enabling up to 15,000m2 coverage with a single sensor ideal for sophisticated flow management applications like security, smart city, social distancing, and smart spaces requiring the accurate tracking of large numbers of people and vehicles in complex environments.
 M8:  features a wide field of view, long measurement range, high accuracy, and fine resolution to reliably solve the most challenging real-world applications.
 S-Series solid state LiDAR sensors: based on optical phased array (OPA) technology offering vibration immunity and more than 100,000 hours of the mean time between failures (MTBF).

References 

Companies listed on the New York Stock Exchange
Companies based in Sunnyvale, California
Technology companies based in the San Francisco Bay Area
Lidar
2002 establishments in California
Technology companies established in 2002
Companies that filed for Chapter 11 bankruptcy in 2022
Laser companies
Special-purpose acquisition companies